Ciolek or Ciołek may refer to:

People
Erazm Ciołek (disambiguation), multiple people with the name
Gerald Ciolek (born 1986), German cyclist
Gerard Antoni Ciołek (1909-1966), Polish architect

Włodzimierz Ciołek (born 1956), Polish footballer

Other
Ciołek coat of arms
Ciołek, Łódź Voivodeship, village in central Poland